Richard Chenevix Trench (Richard Trench until 1873; 9 September 1807 – 28 March 1886) was an Anglican archbishop and poet.

Life
He was born in Dublin, Ireland, the son of Richard Trench (1774–1860), barrister-at-law, and the Dublin writer Melesina Chenevix (1768–1827). His elder brother was Francis Chenevix Trench. He went to school at Harrow, and graduated from Trinity College, Cambridge in 1829. In 1830 he visited Spain. While incumbent of Curdridge Chapel near Bishop's Waltham in Hampshire, he published (1835) The Story of Justin Martyr and Other Poems, which was favourably received, and was followed in 1838 by Sabbation, Honor Neale, and other Poems, and in 1842 by Poems from Eastern Sources. These volumes revealed the author as the most gifted of the immediate disciples of Wordsworth, with a warmer colouring and more pronounced ecclesiastical sympathies than the master, and strong affinities to Alfred Lord Tennyson, John Keble and Richard Monckton Milnes.

In 1841 he resigned his living to become curate to Samuel Wilberforce, then rector of Alverstoke, and upon Wilberforce's promotion to the deanery of Westminster Abbey in 1845 he was presented to the rectory of Itchenstoke. In 1845 and 1846 he preached the Hulsean lecture, and in the former year was made examining chaplain to Wilberforce, now Bishop of Oxford. He was shortly afterwards appointed to a theological chair at King's College London.

Trench joined the Canterbury Association on 27 March 1848, on the same day as Samuel Wilberforce and Wilberforce's brother Robert.

In 1851 he established his fame as a philologist by The Study of Words, originally delivered as lectures to the pupils of the Diocesan Training School, Winchester. His stated purpose was to demonstrate that in words, even taken singly, "there are boundless stores of moral and historic truth, and no less of passion and imagination laid up"—an argument which he supported by a number of apposite illustrations. It was followed by two little volumes of similar character—English Past and Present (1855) and A Select Glossary of English Words (1859). All have gone through numerous editions and have contributed much to promote the historical study of the English tongue. Another great service to English philology was rendered by his paper, read before the Philological Society, On some Deficiencies in our English Dictionaries (1857), which gave the first impulse to the great Oxford English Dictionary. Trench envisaged a totally new dictionary that was a 'lexicon totius Anglicitatis'. As one of the three founders of the dictionary, he expressed his vision thus: it would be 'an entirely new Dictionary; no patch upon old garments, but a new garment throughout'.

His advocacy of a revised translation of the New Testament (1858) helped promote another great national project. In 1856 he published a valuable essay on Calderón, with a translation of a portion of Life is a Dream in the original metre. In 1841 he had published his Notes on the Parables of our Lord, and in 1846 his Notes on the Miracles, popular works which are treasuries of erudite and acute illustration.

In 1856 Trench became Dean of Westminster Abbey, a position which suited him. Here he introduced evening nave services. In January 1864 he was advanced to the post of Archbishop of Dublin. Arthur Penrhyn Stanley had been first choice, but was rejected by the Irish Church, and, according to Bishop Wilberforce's correspondence, Trench's appointment was favoured neither by the prime minister nor the lord-lieutenant. It was, moreover, unpopular in Ireland, and a blow to English literature; yet it turned out to be fortunate. Trench could not prevent the disestablishment of the Irish Church, though he resisted with dignity. But, when the disestablished communion had to be reconstituted under the greatest difficulties, it was important that the occupant of his position should be a man of a liberal and genial spirit.

This was the work of the remainder of Trench's life; it exposed him at times to considerable abuse, but he came to be appreciated, and, when in November 1884 he resigned his archbishopric because of poor health, clergy and laity unanimously recorded their sense of his "wisdom, learning, diligence, and munificence." He had found time for Lectures on Medieval Church History (1878); his poetical works were rearranged and collected in two volumes (last edition, 1885). He died in London, after a lingering illness.

From 1872 and during his successor's incumbency the post of Dean of Christ Church, Dublin was held with the archbishopric. He died on 28 March 1886 at Eaton Square, London, and was buried at Westminster Abbey.

George W. E. Russell described Trench as "a man of singularly vague and dreamy habits" and recounted the following anecdote of his old age:He once went back to pay a visit to his successor, Lord Plunket. Finding himself back again in his old palace, sitting at his old dinner-table, and gazing across it at his wife, he lapsed in memory to the days when he was master of the house, and gently remarked to Mrs Trench, "I am afraid, my love, that we must put this cook down among our failures."

Trench's Letters and Memorial
 Richard Chenevix Trench, Archbishop: Letters and Memorials, Edited by the Author of “Charles Lowder” (Maria Trench),  Volume 1 (1888).
 Chenevix Trench, Archbishop: Letters and Memorials, Edited by the Author of “Charles Lowder” (Maria Trench), Volume 2 (1888).]

Family
Richard Chenevix Trench married his cousin, Hon. Frances Mary Trench, daughter of Francis Trench and Mary Mason, and sister of the 2nd Lord Ashtown, on 1 June 1832. They had 14 children; 8 sons and 6 daughters:

 Francis William Trench (1833–1841)
 Melesina Mary Chenevix Trench (1834–1918)
 Richard Trench (1836–1861)
 Frederic Chenevix Trench (1837–1894) (Major General Trench)
 Charles Chenevix Trench (1839–1933)
 Arthur Julius Trench (1840–1860)
 Emily Elizabeth Trench (1842–1842)
 Philip Chenevix Trench (1843–1848)
 Edith Chenevix Trench (1844–1942), married in 1889 Reginald Stephen Copleston (1845–1925), Bishop of Colombo and later Bishop of Calcutta
 Helen Emily Chenevix Trench (1846–1935)
 Frances Harriet Chenevix Trench (1847–1941)
 Rose Julia Chenevix Trench (1848–1902)
 Alfred Chenevix Trench (1849–1938)
 Herbert Francis Chenevix Trench (1850–1900)

Works

The Story of Justin Martyr and other Poems (1835).
 The Story of Justin Martyr and other Poems (2nd Edition, 1835).
 Sabbation; Honor Neale, and other Poems (1838).
 Poems (1841).
 Poems from Eastern Sources: the Steadfast Prince, and other Poems (1842).
 Genoveva: a Poem, (1842).
 [https://books.google.com/books?id=Sto9AAAAYAAJ Story of Justin Martyr: Sabbation and Other Poems (1844).
 The Fitness of Holy Scripture for Unfolding the Spiritual Life of Man (1845 & 1856).
 Christ the Desire of all Nations: Being The Hulsean Lectures  (1846).
 The Hulsean Lectures: Christ the Desire of all Nations for 1845 and 1846: 2nd  ed., rev. (1847).
  on the Parables of Our Lord (1847).]
 Sacred Latin Poetry (1849).
 [https://books.google.com/books?id=UjQO1MUk2LYC on the Miracles of Our Lord (1850).
 Star of the Wise Men (1850).]
 [https://books.google.com/books?id=yClhAAAAcAAJ&q=Richard+Trench+%27%27Exposition+of+the+Sermon+on+the+Mount%27%27 of the Sermon on the Mount: Second Edition Revised and Improved (1851).
 from Eastern Sources, Genoveva, and other Poems (1851).]
 [https://books.google.com/books?id=4poCAAAAQAAJ the Lessons in Proverbs: Five Lectures (1853).
 On the Study of Words: Five Lectures, Fourth Edition Revised (1853).
 Fitness of the Holy Scripture (1854).]
 Alma: and Other Poems (1855).
 Calderon, his Life and Genius, with Specimens of his Plays (1856).
 [http://babel.hathitrust.org/cgi/pt?id=pst.000001692488;view=1up;seq=13Life's a Dream: The Great Theatre of the World trans from the Spanish of Calderon, with an Essay on His Life and Genius (1856 & 1860).
 Poems (1856).
 On Some Deficiencies in our English Dictionaries (1857).
 Preached Before the University of Cambridge (1857).]
 [https://books.google.com/books?id=3BK42TUrVQcC the Authorized Version of the New Testament (1858).
 Brands Plucked Out of the Fire: A Sermon (1858).
 the English Language, Past and Present: Five Lectures (1858).]
 [https://books.google.com/books?id=Ty8R-A_FrGsC Select Glossary of English Words (1860).
 Preached in Westminster Abbey (1860).]
 [https://books.google.com/books?id=R0hVAAAAcAAJ of the New Testament: Fifth Edition Revised (1860).
 and their Lessons (1861).]
 Commentary on the Epistles to the Seven Churches in Asia: Revelation II, III (1863).
 Every Good Gift from Above (1864).
 Collected and Arranged Anew (1865).]
 Studies in the Gospels (1867).
 A Household Book of English Poetry (1868).
 Plutarch, his life, and his Lives and his Morals (1873).
 [https://books.google.com/books?id=4joPAAAAIAAJ Preached for the Most Part in Ireland (1873).
 Synonyms of the New Testament: 9th  ed., improved (1880).
 Brief Thoughts and Meditations on some Passages in Holy Scripture (1884).
 on Medieval Church History (1886).]
 [https://books.google.com/books?id=Su08AQAAIAAJ New and Old (1886).
 Shipwrecks of Faith: Three Sermons (1886).			
 Sonnets and Elegiacs (1910).
 [https://books.google.com/books?id=F9g9AAAAYAAJ Study of Words: Condensed by Grenville Kleiser  (1911).

See also

Parables of Jesus
Miracles of Jesus

Notes

References

Further reading
 Downing, Gregory M. (1998). "Richard Chenevix Trench and Joyce's Historical Study of Words," Joyce Studies Annual, Vol. IX, pp. 37–68.
 Sperling, Matthew (2014). "Richard Chenevix Trench." In: Visionary Philology: Geoffrey Hill and the Study of Words. Oxford University Press, pp. 40–72.
 Wiersbe, Warren W. (2009). “Richard Chenevix Trench” in 50 People Every Christian Should Know: Learning from Spiritual Giants of the Faith .  BakerBooks, pp. 67–73

External links

 
 
 
 New Testament Synonyms
 on Trench’s tomb in Westminster Abbey.
 Richard C. Trench Loved Words: A Brief Biography.
 Chenevix Trench: Poems.
 biography and poems used as hymns.

0010010010101000111010010101

1807 births
1886 deaths
People educated at Harrow School
Alumni of Trinity College, Cambridge
Academics of King's College London
Deans of Christ Church Cathedral, Dublin
Anglican archbishops of Dublin
British poets
Presidents of the Cambridge Union
Deans of Westminster
Members of the Privy Council of Ireland
Richard
Members of the Canterbury Association
British male poets
19th-century poets
19th-century British male writers
Irish Anglican archbishops